The Misadventures of Tron Bonne is an action-adventure game that was developed and published by Capcom for the PlayStation. Released in Japan in 1999 and in North America and Europe in 2000, the game is part of the Mega Man Legends (Rockman DASH) series. It is also a prequel and spin-off of the first Legends game.

Rather than focusing on the heroic protagonists of Mega Man Legends series, the game follows series antihero Tron Bonne, sister of the criminal Bonne family of air pirates. The Japanese counterpart included PocketStation support whereas the North American and European version did not.

Gameplay
Unlike other games in the Mega Man series, MTB bears three distinct play styles, each related to a specific mission. Players are tasked with completing (with gradual difficulty) "moving-box" puzzle stages (containers of various contents in Teche and Primiki Harbor), a Descent-like adventure stage, and several action stages similar to the remainder of the Mega Man Legends series (robbing a bank near Gold City and exploring the Nakkai Ruins themselves). Another gameplay aspect is a collection mission built into one of the action missions, located in Sart Farm, where you must gather pigs, cows and horses. Players can choose freely among the three stage types at any time, but each level may only be cleared once. The only exception is the Nakkai Ruins, which can be explored anytime, however the player may only collect Diana's Tear (by defeating the boss) once (afterwards the boss room will be empty).

Instrumental in the game's story is the interaction between Tron and her army of forty loyal Servbots. Each Servbot is given a personality and a few other traits, and the player's investigation and interaction is rewarded with money for the loan, additional parts and weapons for the Gustaff, or other assistance. Servbots also play a role during the adventure and action stages (limited to seven, three or one, depending on the type, generally one leading the others, and called "sniper"), assisting Tron in her quest by ransacking houses or defeating minor threats as the situation and their individual skills warrant. A Servbot's skills may be increased by putting him through training exercises (attack and speed), going on missions (brains) or by disciplining him in the Torture Room (thus lowering the sloth level); in both cases, the effect of the action is determined by a minigame. Some Servbots learn their special skill once their skills reach a high enough level, whilst others learn it as soon as they're given a certain special item.

Plot
The family's leader, Teisel Bonne, seeks an ancient ruin (the Nakkai Ruins) to try and uncover a gigantic and highly valuable Refractor (Diana's Tear). He has a short rendezvous with Bon Bonne, but he and Bon are quickly subdued and captured by Glyde, a rival air pirate in the service of Mr. Loath. Tron finds out that the money used to build the Bonnes' flying fortress was funded by Mr. Loath, and can only watch helplessly, having chosen to act as Spotter for the mission. After discovering that Teisel defaulted on his 1,000,000-zenny loan, she realises that she has no choice but to pay off the loan, or Teisel and Bon will not be seen again. Seeing no other options, Tron suits up in a custom Gustaff mecha and, along with her army of 40 identical Servbots, begins her quest to pay the ransom through any means possible; especially by theft.

During repeated bank robberies, Tron meets (and to an extent, befriends) officer Denise Marmalade, who repeatedly fails to stop her, even when engaging Tron in her own police-issue mecha. In the caves, the Servbots find the three Aurora Stones, help the restless spirit of a man that died trying to find the Fountain of Youth (which was, in fact, a primitive form of root beer), and help two Diggers fall in love. And in the ruins, Tron explores for valuable artifacts, including Diana's Tear (which Teisel was meant to find).

After various adventures, Tron brings the one million zenny to Mr. Loath, who then claims that Teisel also owes interest on his loan, to the sum of two million zenny. She proceeds to acquire the requested money, and is then told that she owes interest on the interest. Realizing that Loath will never let Teisel and Bon go, she too is captured and placed in Teisel's cell.

At this point, the player takes control of their Favorite Servbot (who has the distinctive "red head parts"), who sets off on a rescue mission. Though the Favorite Servbot succeeds in freeing Teisel, Tron, and Bon Bonne, and then Tron succeeds in defeating Glyde, Loath is still able to activate his secret weapon: the Colossus. The Bonnes at first try to attack it with the Gesselschaft's weapons, but this has almost no effect, and the Colossus' return fire causes Tron to be very seriously injured and Teisel to get thrown overboard. Thus, the Favorite Servbot and his Servbot crew have to take on the Colossus in the Gustaff. They succeed, finally defeating Loath and Glyde once and for all. And to ensure they never cause trouble again, Tron hands them into the police, saving officer Denise's job in the process (as she gets given the credit for catching them).

The issue finally resolved, the Bonnes, reunited, set off for Kattelox Island. While in flight, the Favorite Servbot accidentally throws out a giant Refractor won from Loath with the trash, causing Tron and Teisel to freak out and force a pit stop to search for it. Some time after, the events of Mega Man Legends take place.

Development
The Misadventures of Tron Bonne was first revealed in December 1998. A Capcom representative said that although a release was not confirmed yet, the staff would to announce it in a short time due to the popularity of the first Mega Man Legends game.

In June 1999, Capcom announced that Tron Ni Kobun would come packed with a trial demo version of the then-upcoming Rockman DASH 2 (Mega Man Legends 2). The demo was meant to provide better graphics and a larger scale universe. According to the official Japanese Rockman DASH website by Capcom, the Japanese demo isn't by any means a prototype, but an adventure "completely independent" from the final retail product of the game. The demo is known as Rockman DASH 2: Episode 1 ~ Roll-chan Kiki Ippatsu!. The demo included in the North American version would much more closely resemble the final content of the game, consisting of three selectable events, two being boss fights (against Tron's crabbot and a giant ape-ish Reaverbot, which can be considered as "easy" and "hard", respectively) and the last one the full exploration of the Forbidden Ruins).

The game has the same voice acting from the rest of the other Legends games for its main characters. In the North American version, Tron Bonne is voiced by Caroly Larson, while Teisel is voiced by Rob Smith (Tesshō Genda in Japan). This is the only game in the Legends series where Ikue Ōtani does not provide Bon Bonne's voice for the North American version. The Japanese version of the game features two vocal songs, "Love Letter" and "Magic!", both sung by Mayumi Iizuka, Tron Bonne's Japanese voice actress.

Reception

The game received "favorable" reviews according to the review aggregation website GameRankings. Jeff Lundrigan of Next Generation said in an early review, "This is not a game that's neatly pigeonholed as anything, whether by game genre, or by approach, which as far as we're concerned is reason enough to like it. The bonus is that it also happens to be terrific." In Japan, Famitsu gave it a score of 27 out of 40.

According to Media Create sales information, The Misadventures of Tron Bonne was the 212th best-selling video game in Japan in 1999 at 61,127 copies sold. Eidos reported light sales of the game, among other releases, for its first quarter financial results ending June 30, 2000.

In a 2007 retrospective of the Mega Man series, Jeremy Parish of 1UP.com ranked The Misadventures of Tron Bonne as "Worth it!", with comments focused on the gameplay and the playable characters. GameSpot called it a "bridge" between Mega Man Legends and its sequel and that some fans would not find it appealing.

Notes

References

External links
 Official website 
 
 

1999 video games
Action-adventure games
Action role-playing video games
Mega Man Legends
PlayStation (console) games
PlayStation Network games
Video games about pirates
Video games developed in Japan
Video games featuring female protagonists
Video game prequels